Kiril Džajkovski (Djaikovski), – often credited as simply Kiril – is an internationally acclaimed Macedonian electronic musician and music composer.

Biography
In the early 1980s together with Milčo Mančevski he formed Bastion, one of the first electronic bands in the then Socialist Republic of Macedonia within SFR Yugoslavia. Subsequently, he went on to play with one of the most famous Macedonian bands Leb i sol, recording two albums and touring extensively around the Balkans and the rest of Europe.

In the 1990s, Kiril moved to Australia and began experimenting with music, combining ethnic Macedonian music and electronic beats. This led to his first solo release, Synthetic Theatre, an EP received extremely well by Australian independent radio stations.

In 2000, American label Tone Casualties released his album Homebound, which continued the concept of blending Macedonian ethnic instrumentation and electronica. It received excellent reviews from critics around the world, including individuals from the United States, Canada, UK, Spain and Japan. Croatian Playboy Magazine voted it the best album of the year from the former Yugoslavia.

After returning to the Republic of Macedonia, he composed the film score for Milčo Mančevski's Dust, as well as for the films Bal-Can-Can and The Great Water. He performed concerts around Macedonia and abroad, including performances at the international Exit Festival. He was also involved in composing additional music for the 2007 Milčo Mančevski film Shadows.

Several of Džajkovski's compositions were featured on the critically acclaimed Australian miniseries, Underbelly.

Discography
 Bastion - Bastion - PGP RTB
 Razorbrain - Razorbrain - EMI AUSTRALIA
 Synthetic Theatre - Kiril - AG RECORDS
 Recorded Supplement - Aparatchicks - AG RECORDS
 Homebound - Kiril - AG Records/TONE CASUALTIES
 Religion & Sex - Kiril - AG Records/THIRD EAR MUSIC
 Dust -OST- AG Records/THIRD EAR MUSIC
 Bal-Can-Can - OST- AG Records/
 The Great Water- OST- AG Records/ 
 Works & Re-works-Bastion- AG Records/
 La Capinera-OST-AG Records/
 Djaikovski EP - KDZ Music

Music for films
 Tough Granny — dir. Milcho Manchevski
 Marika on an Airplane — dir. Boris Damovski
 Northern Mistake - dir. Boris Damovski
 1=1=1 - dir. John Pedder
 Leonardo (animated series) - dir. Boro Pejcinov
 Dust - dir. Milcho Manchevski
 The Great Water - dir. Ivo Trajkov
 Absence - dir. Vanja Dimitrova
 Bal-Can-Can - dir. Darko Mitrevski
 Shadows - dir. Milcho Manchevski
 The Third Half - dir. Darko Mitrevski
 Balkan Is Not Dead - dir. Aleksandar Popovski
 Willow - dir. Milcho Manchevski

Music for theatre
 Powder Keg --- Kerempuh, Croatia
 Roberto Zucco --- Atelje 212, Yugoslavia
 Proud Flesh ---- Dramski Teatar, Macedonia
 Balkan Is Not Dead ------- MNT, Macedonia
 Dracula ------- SNG Maribor, Slovenia
 Danton's Death---- CSS Teatro Stabile, Italy
 Cherry Orchard----- SNP, Serbia
 Three Sisters----- NTB, Macedonia
 Tempest------ Turkish Drama, Macedonia
 Alisa------ Atelje 212, Serbia, Intercult, Sweden
 For Now, Nowhere------ SNG Ljubljana, Slovenia
 New Friends------ NTNG, Greece
 Incident in the Town of Goga------ SLG Celje, Slovenia
 La Capinera------ Terazije Theater, Serbia
 A Midsummer Night’s Dream--- Gavella, Croatia

Compilations
 Fathom -Antipodian Beats----- Angel's Trumpet, Melbourne
 mACIDonia 2000----- PMG Recordings, Skopje
 Max Trax 2002----- Tone Casualties, Los Angeles
 Pathaans Small World----- Stoned Asia, London
 Dynamik----- Vital Song, Paris
 High On House - New York to Melbourne----- Odessa Mama Records, Melbourne
 Ritmistika------ Third Ear Music, Skopje
 Taking Care of Business--- 10 Kilo, London
 Together- Barramundi 4----- Pschent Music, Paris
 Euro Lounge------ Putumayo, New York
 Musique & Cinema du Monde----- Nada/ MK2 Music, Paris
 Ali B Presents Y4K----- Distinctive Records, London
 Melbourne Yard----- PBS FM, Melbourne
 Balkan Beats 2----- Eastblok, Berlin
 Balkan Beats 3----- Eastblok, Berlin

Music for documentaries
 Guns N' Roses - (1991 Australian Film Institute Award for Best Documentary)
 The Gulf Between - dir. Monique Schwartz
 Koorie Culture/Koori Control - dir. Russel Porter
 In the Line of Fire - dir. Marion Crooke

Singles
 Primitive Science
 Baba Zumbula - ft. Vlada Divljan
 Raise Up Your Hand - ft. Ras Tweed and Esma 
 Lion's Den - ft. MC Wasp and Ghetto Priest 
 Hell Of A Road - ft. TK Wonder
 Spin Off - ft. MC Wasp
 Reminder - ft. LionD
 Music Man - ft. Lion D
 Red Safari - ft. Lion D

See also
Bastion
Music of Republic of Macedonia

References

External links
Official Website
Balcancan review
The Great Water review
Concert in Sarajevo (photo)

Year of birth missing (living people)
Living people
Macedonian musicians